Norazlina Amir Sharipuddin, known professionally as Amelina (born 4 August 1974) is a Malaysian singer. She found success during the 1990s. She is known for popularizing Dangdut music, a type of popular music, from which she earned the title Ratu Dangdut Malaysia ("Malaysian Queen of Dangdut").

Early life 
Amelina was born on 4 August 1974 in Nilai, Negeri Sembilan. She was the eldest of five children born to Hasmah Ramli and Amir Sharipuddin Abdul Raof. She attended school in her hometown before migrating to Kuala Lumpur to become a singer in 1994 at age 20. Prior to music, she worked in a TDK electronics factory.

As an artist, Amelina was managed by her brother Amir Hanafi and assisted by her mother, Hasmah, who was responsible for the idea to try Dangdut. Amelina gifted a piece of land in her hometown to build a bungalow to house her family.

Discography 
Studio albums
 Amelina (1994)
 Asyik (1995)
 Cinta Oh Cinta (1997)

Filmography

Drama

Telemovie

Television

References

External links 
 
 
 Amelina on Discogs

Malay-language singers
People from Negeri Sembilan
Malaysian actresses
Malaysian women singers
Malaysian Muslims
Malaysian people of Malay descent
Living people
1974 births